Petter Gottschalk (born March 27, 1950) is a Norwegian professor of IT strategy employed at the BI Norwegian Business School at its Institute for Leadership and Organizational Management.

He is educated Diplom-Kaufmann from Berlin Institute of Technology, Master of Science from Dartmouth College and Massachusetts Institute of Technology, and Doctor of Business Administration from Henley Management College and Brunel University.

Gottschalk has previously been CEO of Norwegian Computing Center, ABB Datakabel, Statens kantiner and Norsk Informasjonsteknologi (NIT).

In recent years, Gottschalk has done research on the police and their use of IT. He has also done much research on knowledge management, and he has published a number of books on that subject, as well as books about the police. He has also worked as an advisor to the police. His research on the police and their use of information technology has resulted in his appearance in the news media when this topic has been in the news. Gottschalk also researches crime as seen from the police perspective, in particular organized crime and financial crime. In recent years, he has published many articles as well as a number of books in English about organized crime, financial crime and criminal entrepreneurship. Gottschalk was an active participant in the Norwegian public discourse about EU's Data Retention Directive in 2010 expressing his opinion that the police ought to make better use of the sources they already have.

References

Living people
1950 births
Norwegian business theorists
Norwegian chief executives
Technical University of Berlin alumni
Dartmouth College alumni
Massachusetts Institute of Technology alumni
Alumni of the University of Reading
Alumni of Brunel University London
Academic staff of BI Norwegian Business School
Place of birth missing (living people)